Broussais is a French given name and surname. Notable people with the name include:

 Broussais Coman Beck, American businessman
 Émile Broussais (1855–1943), French politician
 François-Joseph-Victor Broussais (1772–1838), French physician

French-language surnames